Shéu Han (born 3 August 1953), simply known as Shéu, is a Portuguese retired footballer who played as a central midfielder.

He only played for Benfica during a 17-year professional career. He also served as their caretaker manager in 1999.

Club career
Shéu, who has Chinese ancestry, was born in Inhassoro, Portuguese Mozambique. He arrived in Portugal in 1970, joining S.L. Benfica's youth ranks and making his first appearance with the main squad in October 1972, but only became a regular three seasons later.

Shéu would remain in Lisbon until the end of his career and even captained the team from 1987 to 1988. He was an important member in the conquest of nine Primeira Liga championships and six domestic cups.

In addition, Shéu played in the 1983 UEFA Cup Final which Benfica lost to R.S.C. Anderlecht 1–2 on aggregate, scoring the leading goal in the return leg in Lisbon, and also helped his only club to the 1987–88 European Cup final, a penalty shootout loss to PSV Eindhoven. He retired with 349 league games, only surpassed in midfield by another club legend and countryman, Mário Coluna. In the summer of 1989 he played in the National Soccer League with Toronto First Portuguese.

After ending his career in May 1989, Shéu became a coach, serving as assistant for Benfica and in other several directorial capacities for more than two decades. In May 1999, after Graeme Souness' departure, he acted as interim manager.

Shéu left his post as technical secretary at the end of the 2017–18 campaign, but he remained at the Estádio da Luz.

International career
Shéu was capped 24 times for the Portugal national team, scoring one goal. His debut came in a 1–3 defeat to Italy in Turin on 7 April 1976, in a friendly match, and his last appearance was in Bern, a 1–1 draw with Switzerland on 29 October 1986 for the UEFA Euro 1988 qualifiers.

Shéu also featured for the nation during Euro 1984's qualifying campaign, but did not make the final squad which eventually finished as semi-finalists in France.

|}

Honours
Benfica
 Primeira Divisão: 1972–73, 1974–75, 1975–76, 1976–77, 1980–81, 1982–83, 1983–84, 1986–87, 1988–89
 Taça de Portugal (6): 1979–80, 1980–81, 1982–83, 1984–85, 1985–86, 1986–87
 Supertaça Cândido de Oliveira (2): 1980, 1985
 Taça de Honra (6)
 European Cup: Runner-up 1987–88
 UEFA Cup: Runner-up 1982–83

See also
 List of one-club men

References

External links
 
 
 
 

1953 births
Living people
People from Inhambane Province
Portuguese people of Chinese descent
Colonial people in Mozambique
Sportspeople of Chinese descent
Mozambican footballers
Portuguese footballers
Association football midfielders
Primeira Liga players
Canadian National Soccer League players
S.L. Benfica footballers
Toronto First Portuguese players
Portugal international footballers
Portuguese football managers
S.L. Benfica managers
Primeira Liga managers
Portuguese expatriate footballers
Expatriate soccer players in Canada
Portuguese expatriate sportspeople in Canada
S.L. Benfica non-playing staff